Edsel Gomez (born August 9, 1962) is a Puerto Rican jazz pianist. In 2007, he was nominated for a Grammy Award for the album Cubist Music. He arranged and directed Dee Dee Bridgewater's Grammy-winning recording Eleanora Fagan (1915-1959): To Billie with Love from Dee Dee Bridgewater. He has worked with Jack DeJohnette, Don Byron, Brian Lynch, and Eddie Palmieri.

After a research study promoted by the Philippine Heritage Library and Ayala Museum in Manila, Philippines, he began the Edsel Gomez World Fusion Band, which explores the fusion of Philippine traditional and tribal music with jazz and Afro Caribbean music.

Discography

As leader
."Celebrating Chico Buarque De Hollanda" (Mix House, 1999)
 América: Arismar Do Espírit O Santo (Lua, 2005)
 Cubist Music (Zoho Music, 2006)
 Road to Udaipur (Zoho Music, 2015)

As sideman
With Freddie Bryant
 1999 Boogaloo Brasileiro
 2000 Live at Smoke

With David Sánchez
 1998 Obsession
 2000 Melaza
 2001 Travesía
 2004 Coral

With Don Byron
  
 1992 Tuskegee Experiments
  1995 " Music For Six Musicians"
 2001 You Are #6: More Music for Six Musicians

With Richard Bona
 1999 Scenes from My Life
 2001 Reverence

With Conrad Herwig
 2004 Another Kind of Blue: The Latin Side of Miles Davis
 2004 Que Viva Coltrane
 2006 Sketches of Spain y Mas: The Latin Side of Miles Davis

With Humberto Ramírez
 1992 Jazz Project
 2007 Humberto Ramírez Presents Smooth Latin Jazz
 2008 Trompeta Tropical

With Dee Dee Bridgewater
 2007 Red Earth
 2010 Eleanora Fagan (1915-1959): To Billie with Love from Dee Dee Bridgewater
 2011 Midnight Sun

With Tony Lujan
 2001 You Don't Know What Love Is
 2004 Tribute

With others
 1992 Prodigios Delights, Prodigio
 1994 Debutaste En Mi, Jorge Escobar
 1999 A Day in the Life, Eric Benét
 2001 Branching Out, William Cepeda and Afrorican Jazz
 2001 Rite of Passage, Sunny Sumter
 2002 Piñero, Kip Hanrahan
 2003 Let's Go to the Rumba!, Rumbantela
 2004 10 Anos, Arismar Do Espirito Santo
 2004 El Hombre, Carlos "Patato" Valdes
 2005 The Color of Things, Sandro Albert
 2006 A Thousand Beautiful Things, Janis Siegel
 2006 Simpatico, Eddie Palmieri, Brian Lynch
 2007 Língua, Caetano Veloso
 2007 Vision of Love, Christine Capdeville
 2009 The Chick Corea Songbook, The Manhattan Transfer
 2015 East Side Rio Drive, Nilson Matta

References 

American jazz pianists
Living people
1962 births
21st-century pianists
Zoho Music artists
Puerto Rican jazz musicians